Nacaome, with a population of 19,990 (2020 calculation), is the capital city of the Valle department of Honduras and the municipal seat of Nacaome Municipality. It is a manufacturing and commercial center located on the banks of the Nacaome River.

Nacaome is an old city founded when aboriginal Cholulas and Chaparrastiques, tired of fighting each other, thought it best to join together to build new houses in the middle of their territory on the west side of the Chapulapa River (the aboriginal name of the Nacaome River). They named the new town Naca-Ome, meaning "union of two races" in their dialects. In Nahuatl Naca means race or body and Ome means two. This foundation happened before the Spanish conquerors came.

Nacaome was affected by Hurricane Stan in October 2005.

Demographics
At the time of the 2013 Honduras census, Nacaome municipality had a population of 57,345. Of these, 96.20% were Mestizo, 3.22% White, 0.47% Black or Afro-Honduran, 0.08% Indigenous and 0.03% others.

References

Sources 
Banegas, Ramon. "Historia de Nacaome". Banco Central de Honduras. Agosto 1996.

Municipalities of the Valle Department